The Ishikawajima-Harima Heavy Industries (IHI) XF5 is a low bypass turbofan engine developed in Japan by Ishikawajima-Harima Heavy Industries for the Mitsubishi X-2 Shinshin (ATD-X).

Applications
 Mitsubishi X-2 Shinshin

Specifications (XF5-1)

See also

References

XF5
Low-bypass turbofan engines
2010s turbofan engines